The women's rhythmic individual all-around competition at the 2018 Asian Games took place from 27 to 28 August 2018 at the Jakarta International Expo Hall D2.

Schedule
All times are Western Indonesia Time (UTC+07:00)

Results
Legend
DNF — Did not finish
DNS — Did not start

Qualification

Final

References

External links
Results

Rhythmic Women's individual all-around